The X-Men are a fictional superhero team created by Marvel Comics that appear in comic books and other forms of media.

Television

Animation

1960s
The X-Men made their first animated appearance on The Marvel Super Heroes TV series in 1966 with Professor X commanding the original X-Men line-up of Cyclops, Beast, Marvel Girl, Angel, and Iceman. In this episode the X-Men are not referred to as the X-Men but rather as the Allies for Peace.

1980s
The X-Men guest-starred in several episodes of Spider-Man and His Amazing Friends, starting with a flashback in "The Origin of Iceman". X-Men member Sunfire appeared in a later episode teaming up with the Amazing Friends. The X-Men's next appearance was in "A Firestar is Born", which included appearances from Professor X, Storm, Angel, Cyclops, Wolverine and Juggernaut. The X-Men returned the following season in "The X-Men Adventure", with appearances from Professor X, Cyclops, Kitty Pryde (as Sprite), Storm, Nightcrawler, Colossus and Thunderbird.
In 1989, Marvel Productions produced a half-hour X-Men pilot episode titled X-Men: Pryde of the X-Men. It related the story of Kitty Pryde's first adventure with Professor X, Cyclops, Storm, Wolverine, Colossus, Nightcrawler, and Dazzler as they fought against Magneto, the White Queen, Juggernaut, the Blob, Pyro and Toad. The series was never picked up but the single episode aired infrequently in syndication during the Marvel Action Universe series and was released on video in 1990.

1990s
In 1992, Fox, 20th Century Fox Television, and Fox Kids launched an X-Men animated series with the roster of Cyclops, Wolverine, Rogue, Storm, Beast, Gambit, Jubilee, Jean Grey and Professor X with Morph making occasional appearances. The two-part pilot episode, "Night of the Sentinels", began a five-season series, ending in 1997.
The X-Men guest-starred on Spider-Man in episodes "The Mutant Agenda" and "Mutants Revenge", when Spider-Man seeks Professor X's help. Storm would later guest-star in the Secret Wars arc.
In 1995, Cyclops, Jean Grey, Gambit, Wolverine, Storm, and Juggernaut, along with the Scarlet Spider, made cameos in the Fantastic Four series, in "Nightmare in Green".

2000s
 In 2000, The WB Network launched X-Men: Evolution, which portrayed many of the X-Men as teenagers attending a regular public high school while training to control their powers at the Xavier's School for Gifted Youngsters. The series ended in 2003 after its fourth season. The main cast of young X-Men comprised Cyclops, Jean Grey, Spyke, Rogue, Kitty Pryde (as Shadowcat), and Nightcrawler. Their adult mutant mentors included Professor X, Storm, Wolverine, and Beast. The series also featured the New Mutants starting in the second season, consisting of Boom Boom, Sunspot, Iceman, Wolfsbane, Magma, Multiple, Jubilee, Berzerker and Cannonball. Angel also makes appearances. Colossus, X-23 and Gambit appear as villains in this incarnation. The series was released by Warner Bros. Television Studios instead of releasing by 20th Century Fox Television.
In 2003, the X-Men and mutant-kind were mentioned in an episode of the short-lived CGI series Spider-Man: The New Animated Series, "The Party". Peter Parker is quoted as saying, "I bet the X-Men get to go to parties." Soon after, he is ambushed by a group of police officers, one of them calling him a "mutant freak".
  In 2006, Minimates released a short animated brickfilm, X-Men: Darktide on DVD with a box set of figures. The story involved the X-Men battling the Brotherhood at an oil rig. The team consists of Cyclops, Jean Grey, Archangel, Wolverine, the Beast, Xavier and Storm. The Brotherhood team is Mystique, Magneto and Juggernaut.
Wolverine and the X-Men debuted in the United States on January 23, 2009. It featured Wolverine, Emma Frost, Cyclops, Beast, Storm, Kitty Pryde (as Shadowcat), Iceman, Rogue, Nightcrawler, Angel-Archangel, Jean Grey and Professor X. The show was cancelled after just one season.
The X-Men appeared on Cartoon Network's The Super Hero Squad Show. Unlike their comic book counterparts, mutants are not discriminated against in Super Hero City, resulting in Professor X opening "Mutant High", where his students are peacefully tutored by the Professor while helping out other heroes to defend the city from the villains of Villainville lead by Doctor Doom. The X-Men are featured heavily in the episode “Mysterious Mayhem at Mutant High!” Wolverine and later Scarlet Witch both appear as main members of the titular “Super Hero Squad,” while the series also includes appearances from Cyclops, Iceman, Jean Grey, Kitty Pryde, Lockheed, Colossus, Storm, Professor X, X-23, and Firestar.

2010s
As part of a four-series collaboration between the Japanese Madhouse animation house and Marvel, the X-Men and Wolverine both starred in two separate 12 episode anime series that premiered in Japan on Animax and in the United States on G4 in 2011. The X-Men series deals with the X-Men coming to Japan to investigate the disappearance of Armor. The antagonists are the U-Men. It featured Cyclops, Wolverine, Storm, Beast, Emma Frost, Armor and Charles Xavier, as well as frequent flashbacks with Jean Grey. Other X-Men like Colossus and Rogue made cameo appearances in the finale.

2020s
On November 12, 2021, Marvel announced a revival of the 1992–1997 animated series titled X-Men '97 produced by Marvel Studios and is set to release in 2023 on Disney+. Several cast members from the original animated series are set to reprise their roles along with new cast members. Beau DeMayo is announced as the head writer and executive producer for the upcoming series with director Larry Houston, and showrunners and producers Eric and Julia Lewald from the original series will serve as consultants.

Live action
In 1996, the TV movie Generation X aired on Fox Network. Initially a television pilot, it was later broadcast as a television film. It is based on the Marvel comic book series Generation X. The film featured Banshee and Emma Frost as the headmasters of Xavier's School for Gifted Youngsters and M, Skin, Mondo, Jubilee. The team battled a mad scientist who used a machine to develop psychic powers.
In October 2015, 20th Century Fox Television announced that FX had ordered a pilot titled Legion. The series tells the story of David Haller, who is diagnosed as schizophrenic, but following a strange encounter is confronted with the possibility that the voices he hears and the visions he sees might be real. The first season premiered in February 2017. It ended with the third season.
The Gifted is a 20th Century Fox Television series that focuses on two parents who discover their children possess mutant powers. Forced to go on the run from a hostile government, the family joins up with an underground network of mutants and must fight to survive. While the X-Men have been disbanded in the series, the underground network of mutants features comic regulars Blink, Polaris, Thunderbird and The Stepford Cuckoos. Fox ended the series after 2 seasons.

Motion comics
Marvel produced motion comics based on Astonishing X-Men, releasing them on Hulu, iTunes, the PlayStation Store and other video services. These animated episodes were released on DVD through Shout! Factory. It has been announced that Marvel Knights Animation will continue animating Joss Whedon and John Cassaday's run. Starting with the second storyline of the series Astonishing X-Men: Dangerous.

The titles in the series include:
 Astonishing X-Men: Gifted (2009)
 Astonishing X-Men: Dangerous (April 2012)
 Astonishing X-Men: Torn (August 2012)
 Astonishing X-Men: Unstoppable (November 2012)

Film

20th Century Fox franchise

From 2000 to 2020, 20th Century Fox released thirteen superhero films
as part of the X-Men film series.

The first three films focus on the conflict between Professor Xavier and Magneto, who have opposing views on humanity's relationship with mutants. While Xavier believes humanity and mutants can coexist, Magneto believes a war is coming, which he intends to fight and win. The Bryan Singer-directed X-Men was released on July 14, 2000, with the team roster of Professor X (Patrick Stewart), Cyclops (James Marsden), Wolverine (Hugh Jackman), Storm (Halle Berry) and Jean Grey (Famke Janssen). Singer returned for the sequel X2 released on May 2, 2003, with Rogue (Anna Paquin), Iceman (Shawn Ashmore), and Nightcrawler (Alan Cumming) joining the team. Singer was replaced by Brett Ratner for X-Men: The Last Stand, released on May 26, 2006, with Beast (Kelsey Grammer), Angel (Ben Foster), Shadowcat (Elliot Page) and Colossus (Daniel Cudmore) joining. Critics praised Singer's films for their dark, realistic tone, and their focus on prejudice as a subtext. Although Ratner's film was met with mixed reviews, it out-grossed both of its predecessors.

A sequel tetralogy that served as a prequel to the original trilogy started with X-Men: First Class. Following a young Professor X (James McAvoy), Magneto (Michael Fassbender), Beast (Nicholas Hoult), Mystique (Jennifer Lawrence), Havok (Lucas Till) and Banshee (Caleb Landry Jones) as the original team, the film was directed by Matthew Vaughn and released on June 3, 2011. X-Men: Days of Future Past, a sequel to both the original trilogy and X-Men: First Class, with Singer returning to direct, was released on May 23, 2014. The film centered around the original trilogy members using time travel to gain help from their younger counterparts of the prequel tetralogy. X-Men: Apocalypse was released on May 27, 2016, with Mystique leading the team of Beast, Quicksilver (Evan Peters), Storm (Alexandra Shipp), Nightcrawler (Kodi Smit-McPhee), Cyclops (Tye Sheridan) and Jean Grey (Sophie Turner). The tetralogy concluded with a fourth film, Dark Phoenix, written and directed by Simon Kinberg and released on June 7, 2019, and featured the same roster as Apocalypse.

Three spin-off films focusing on Wolverine were also released: X-Men Origins: Wolverine, an origin story of Wolverine that was directed by Gavin Hood, was released on May 1, 2009, followed by The Wolverine, directed by James Mangold and set in Japan, released on July 26, 2013. The series concluded with Logan, once again directed by Mangold and released on March 3, 2017. The film was set in 2029.

Two further spin-offs centering around Deadpool were released in 2016 and 2018. Deadpool, which features Colossus (Andre Tricoteux and voiced by Stefan Kapičić) and his X-Men trainee Negasonic Teenage Warhead (Brianna Hildebrand) was released on February 12, 2016, while Deadpool 2 was released on May 18, 2018, with returning X-Men members Colossus and Negasonic Teenage Warhead and new member Yukio (Shiori Kutsuna) helping Deadpool (Ryan Reynolds) as a X-Men trainee. The film also features cameo appearances of Professor X, Cyclops, Quicksilver, Storm, Nightcrawler and Beast from the sequel tetralogy. An adaptation of X-Force was also in development at 20th Century Fox, with Jeff Wadlow writing and Drew Goddard directing.

Another spin-off and the final film of the 20th Century Fox franchise, The New Mutants, was released on August 28, 2020, directed by Josh Boone, who also co-wrote the screenplay with Knate Gwaltney.

Marvel Cinematic Universe
Marvel Studios launched the Marvel Cinematic Universe (MCU) in 2008, focused on the Avengers and their related characters, whose film rights they still owned. Marvel was then bought by Disney in 2009, but could not use the X-Men or other mutants, as their film rights still resided with 20th Century Fox. However, an alternate version of the post-credits scene in Iron Man (2008) had him specifically mention "assorted mutants" in regards to the larger universe he and Tony Stark were a part of. Quicksilver and the Scarlet Witch were an odd case, as they had strong ties with both the Avengers and the X-Men. The studios negotiated a deal so that they could share the characters' film rights on the stipulation Marvel Studios would be unable to make reference to their background as mutants or as Magneto's children, and that 20th Century Fox could not allude to their history as Avengers members. While Pietro Maximoff / Quicksilver would only appear in two MCU films: Captain America: The Winter Soldier (2014) and Avengers: Age of Ultron (2015), Wanda Maximoff / Scarlet Witch would go on to become a semi-regular character, appearing in six films in the franchise in addition to headlining her own eponymously titled television series. On December 14, 2017, Disney announced its intent to acquire 21st Century Fox's film and television studios, which would thereby result in the film rights to the X-Men and associated characters reverting to Marvel Studios. Disney CEO Bob Iger later confirmed that the X-Men would be integrated into the MCU alongside the Fantastic Four, Silver Surfer and Deadpool. The acquisition was completed on March 20, 2019.

On July 20, 2019, during the San Diego Comic Con, Marvel Studios head Kevin Feige announced that a film centered on mutants, which will be set in the Marvel Cinematic Universe, is in development. When asked if the film will be X-Men-titled, Feige said that the terms "X-Men" and "Mutants" are interchangeable, and said that the MCU's take on the franchise will differ from 20th Century Fox's. After the deal, Charles Xavier / Professor X became the first mutant character to appear in the MCU. He appeared in the film Doctor Strange in the Multiverse of Madness (2022) as an alternate version of Professor X from Earth-838, and as the leader of the Illuminati of this universe, alongside its other members meeting Doctor Strange and putting him for trial due to his travel in the Multiverse. He is later killed by Scarlet Witch of Earth-616 while rescuing her alternate version of Earth-838. Later that year, the MCU streaming series Ms. Marvel also made reference to the X-Men; in the series finale "No Normal", Kamala Khan is told by her friend Bruno that her genetics have a "mutation", underscored by an excerpt of the theme music from the 1992 X-Men series. In the series She-Hulk: Attorney at Law episode "Superhuman Law" where Wolverine gets a mentioned in a news article on a blog site browsed by Jennifer Walters alludes to a man spotted who fought in a bar brawl with metal claws. Additionally, the end-credits of the episode "Mean, Green, and Straight Poured into These Jeans" depicts a graphic of Augustus Pugliese showing off his sneaker collection to Nikki Ramos, a pair of which are directly inspired by the color scheme of Wolverine's classic costume and the team get a mentioned by Jennifer in the season finale episode "Whose Show Is This?".

Video games

Early X-Men games
The first X-Men video game was released by Josh Toevs and LJN for the Nintendo Entertainment System and was titled The Uncanny X-Men. That same year (1989) a computer game was released called X-Men: Madness in Murderworld. Another title, X-Men II: The Fall of the Mutants was released the year after.

Konami created an X-Men arcade game in 1992, which featured six playable X-Men characters: Colossus, Cyclops, Dazzler, Nightcrawler, Storm and Wolverine.

In 1992, the X-Men teamed with Spider-Man for Spider-Man and the X-Men in Arcade's Revenge, released for the Super NES, Genesis, Game Gear and Game Boy.

The following years saw the games X-Men: Gamesmaster's Legacy and X-Men: Mojo World released for the Sega Game Gear.

The X-Men made a few appearances in Spider-Man 2: Enter Electro. Professor X and Rogue run a Danger Room simulation for the player to train in. Beast appears in the first level to demonstrate the controller functions to the player.

In the 1990s, Sega released two X-Men video games for its Genesis; X-Men and X-Men 2: Clone Wars. Wolverine starred in a solo game in 1994 for both the Super NES and Genesis titled Wolverine: Adamantium Rage.  That same year, the X-Men appeared in the X-Men: Mutant Apocalypse game for the Super NES.

X2: Wolverine's Revenge was a stealth-action game for the sixth generation of video games starring Wolverine as the only playable character. It was released on April 14, 2003, produced by Marvel Games, Gene Pool, Activision and was released by 20th Century Fox, on PlayStation 2, GameCube, Xbox, Microsoft Windows and Game Boy Advance.

Fighting games
The X-Men are featured in many 2-D and 3-D fighting games.

In order of release:
X-Men: Children of the Atom (Capcom, 1994)
Marvel Super Heroes (Capcom, 1995)
X-Men vs. Street Fighter (Capcom, 1996)
Marvel Super Heroes vs. Street Fighter (Capcom, 1997)
Marvel vs. Capcom (Capcom, 1998)
X-Men: Mutant Academy (Activision/Paradox Development, 2000)
Marvel vs. Capcom 2: New Age of Heroes (Capcom, 2000)
X-Men: Mutant Academy 2 (Activision/Paradox Development, 2001)
X-Men: Next Dimension (Activision/Paradox Development, 2002)
Marvel vs. Capcom 3: Fate of Two Worlds (Capcom, 2011)
Ultimate Marvel vs. Capcom 3 (Capcom, 2011)
Marvel: Contest of Champions (Kabam, 2014)
Marvel: Future Fight (Netmarble, 2015)

Film-based games
To coincide with the release of the third film, 20th Century Fox, Activision, and Marvel Games released X-Men: The Official Game which filled in gaps between the two Fox X-Men films X2: X-Men United and X-Men: The Last Stand, such as explaining Nightcrawler's absence.

X-Men Legends and Marvel: Ultimate Alliance
X-Men Legends and its sequel X-Men Legends II: Rise of Apocalypse are games that featured multiple X-Men as playable characters.

Every installment of Marvel: Ultimate Alliance has featured the X-Men as one of the numerous playable characters:

Deadpool, Iceman, Storm, and Wolverine are playable in the major Marvel video game, Marvel: Ultimate Alliance. Colossus is playable on the Xbox 360, Wii and PS3 versions of the game, and Jean Grey is playable on the GBA version. Cyclops, Jean Grey, Nightcrawler, Professor X, and Psylocke appear as NPC's on all versions while the Beast, Forge, Karma and Dr. Moira MacTaggert were mentioned by different characters. In addition, during a cut-scene, the Beast, Colossus, Cyclops, Gambit, Magneto, Professor Xavier, Psylocke, and Shadowcat were seen defeated by Doctor Doom alongside the Hulk. Xbox 360 owners were later able to download eight new playable characters for the game, including X-Men heroes and villains: Cyclops, Magneto, Nightcrawler and Sabretooth.

In Marvel: Ultimate Alliance 2, Wolverine, Deadpool, Iceman, Storm, Gambit, and Jean Grey are featured as playable characters while Cyclops and Psylocke are exclusive to PS2, PSP and Wii. While Colossus appears as an NPC. In the briefing that follows the Wakanda incident, Captain America and Iron Man mention that the other X-Men members have been absorbed into The Fold. Psylocke, Cable, Magneto and the Juggernaut were later added as downloadable characters for Marvel: Ultimate Alliance 2.

Wolverine, Storm, Nightcrawler, Psylocke, Deadpool, and Magneto appear as playable characters in Marvel Ultimate Alliance 3: The Black Order, while Mystique and Juggernaut appear as bosses. Cyclops, Colossus, the Beast, and Professor X appear on a portrait in the X-Mansion when Magneto attacks it in the X-Men trailer; the former two are playable DLC characters while the other two also appear as non-playable helper characters.

Books
Science of the X-Men by Linc Yaco and Karen Haber explains how different superpowers would work and how such abilities would affect the people that have them. The mutants featured include Quicksilver, Wolverine, Shadowcat, and Nightcrawler.

Several X-Men novels have been published.

See also
Wolverine in other media
Gambit in other media
Cyclops in other media
Jean Grey in other media

References

External links
The X-Men In Animation – A Retrospective
Wolverine In Animation – A Retrospective
Magneto In Animation – A Retrospective
Cyclops – A Retrospective
Iceman In Animation – A Retrospective
Nightcrawler In Animation – A Retrospective
The Brotherhood Of (Evil) Mutants In Animation – A Retrospective
The Juggernaut In Animation – A Retrospective